Daniel McIntosh may refer to:

 Danny McIntosh (born 1980), British boxer
 D. N. McIntosh (1822–1896), Creek farmer and politician

See also
 Daniel Mackintosh (1815–1891), Scottish geomorphologist and ethnologist